Woodville is an unincorporated community in Perquimans and Pasquotank counties in North Carolina, United States. It lies on U.S. Highway 17, southwest of Elizabeth City.  Stockton is a historic home located south of Woodville and is on the National Register of Historic Places due to its distinct Federal style.

See also
Woodville, North Carolina

References

External links

Unincorporated communities in Perquimans County, North Carolina
Unincorporated communities in North Carolina
Elizabeth City, North Carolina micropolitan area